Church Farmhouse, Kemeys Commander, Monmouthshire is a former parsonage dating from the mid-16th century. The farmhouse and the attached barn are Grade II* listed buildings.

History
Sir Cyril Fox and Lord Raglan, in their three-volume study, Monmouthshire Houses, date Church Farmhouse to 1550–1560. The farmhouse was originally the parsonage to the adjacent Church of All Saints On a tithe map of 1841, the farmhouse is recorded as being occupied by an Eleanor Morgan, who was farming 107 acres.

Architecture and description
The building is a cruck-truss house but without the hall open to the roof, the more common style. It is constructed of whitewashed rubble. The building contains a Tudor door reused from nearby Allt-y-Bela. The attic partition has some, "now much faded", figure paintings of a man, a woman and a child. The farmhouse and its attached barn are Grade II* listed buildings, the listing describing the building as a “well-preserved 16th century farmhouse”.

Notes

References 
 
 

Buildings and structures in Monmouthshire
Grade II* listed buildings in Monmouthshire
Country houses in Wales